Ethmia helenmillerae is a moth in the family Depressariidae. The habitat consists of dry forests.

The ground color of the forewings is white with six defined dots distributed on two-thirds from the base. There is a line at the terminal area from almost the center of the wing to the tornum. The hindwing ground color is dark brown.

Etymology
The species is named in honor of Helen Miller, an early major donor for Area de Conservación Guanacaste rain forest purchase.

References

Moths described in 2014
helenmillerae